Asbanr is a union council in Lower Dir District, Khyber Pakhtunkhwa, Pakistan.

Lower Dir District